Tímea Babos and Michaëlla Krajicek were the defending champions, having won the event in 2013, however both players chose not to participate.

Taiwanese duo Chan Chin-wei and Chuang Chia-jung won the title, defeating Japanese duo Misa Eguchi and Eri Hozumi in the final, 6–1, 3–6, [10–7].

Seeds

Draw

References 
 Draw

Suzhou Ladies Open - Doubles
Suzhou Ladies Open